Two-Mix 25th Anniversary All Time Best is the sixth compilation album by J-pop duo Two-Mix, released by King Records on February 10, 2021.

The album is offered in two editions: 2 CD standard edition and 3 CD + Blu-ray limited edition. The limited edition release features a Mobile Suit Gundam Wing-themed cover illustrated by Tomofumi Ogasawara, who did the artwork for the 2011 manga adaptation New Mobile Report Gundam Wing Endless Waltz: The Glory of Losers. In addition, it includes a Blu-ray disc that contains the "White Reflection" anime music video remastered in high definition.

Background 
On April 29, 2020, at the same time as the start of the Two-Mix's 25th anniversary project, the decision to release a new compilation album was announced. On the same day, the project's official Twitter account went online saying: . On October 23, the decision to release this album was announced and the website for the project was opened. Upon its opening, the website held the "Two-Mix Song General Election", where fans voted for up to five songs to be included in the new album. The winning votes were announced on November 12.

Chart performance 
The album peaked at No. 6 on Oricon's weekly albums chart and No. 7 on Billboard Japans Hot Albums chart, becoming the duo's first top-10 album since Dream Tactix in 1998.

Track listing 
All lyrics are written by Shiina Nagano; all music is composed by Minami Takayama, except where indicated; all music is arranged by Two-Mix, except where indicated.

Charts

References

External links 
 
 
 

2021 compilation albums
Two-Mix compilation albums
Japanese-language compilation albums
King Records (Japan) compilation albums